Rakeem Nathan Nuñez-Roches (born 3 July 1993) is a Belizean professional American football nose tackle for the New York Giants of the National Football League (NFL). He was drafted by the Kansas City Chiefs in the sixth round (217th overall) of the 2015 NFL Draft. He played college football at Southern Miss.

High school career
Nuñez-Roches migrated with his family from Belize to Alabama when he was eight years old  He attended  Central High School in Phenix City, Alabama where he started to play football. For his high school football career, he recorded 132 career tackles, 17 sacks, and four forced fumbles. In football, he was rated as a three-star defensive lineman by ESPN, as well as two stars from Rivals.com and Scout.com. He was selected Second-team All-Area by the Opelika-Auburn News and was an Alabama Top 50 player.

College career
Nuñez-Roches played at the University of Southern Mississippi from 2011 to 2014 where he majored in biological sciences.

As a freshman in 2011, he appeared in six games and was named to the Conference USA All-Freshman team. For the 2011 season, he recorded two tackles and 1.5 tackles-for-loss.

As a sophomore in 2012, he started 11 of 12 games, his only non-start being Southern Miss' senior night game against UTEP. For the 2012 season, he recorded 37 tackles, of which 22 were solo, six tackles-for-loss, one sack, and one forced fumble.

As a junior in 2013, he started the first two games of the season, before suffering a season-ending injury, which earned him a medical redshirt. For the season, he recorded eight tackles, of which two were solo, and 0.5 tackles-for-loss.

As a redshirt junior in 2014, he appeared in 11 games. He recorded 63 tackles (35 solo), 15 tackles-for-loss, four sacks, and one forced fumble. Following the 2014 season, he decided to forgo his final year of eligibility and entered the 2015 NFL Draft.

College statistics

Professional career

Kansas City Chiefs

2015
Nuñez-Roches was drafted in the sixth round with the 217th overall pick in the 2015 NFL Draft by the Kansas City Chiefs. He was the first Belizean born player to ever be drafted in the NFL. On 11 May, he signed his rookie contract with the Chiefs. In the 2015 season, he appeared in seven games and recorded four solo tackles.

2016
On 17 September 2016, Nuñez-Roches was released by the Chiefs. He was signed to the practice squad on 20 September 2016. He was signed to the active roster on 18 October 2016. On 8 December, he recorded his first career sack against the Oakland Raiders. He appeared in eleven games and started five for the Chiefs in the 2016 season.

2017
In 2017, Nuñez-Roches played in all 16 games with 11 starts, recording 24 total tackles.

2018
On 14 March 2018, the Chiefs placed an original-round restricted free agent tender on Nuñez-Roches allowing him to negotiate with another team; however, the Chiefs have an option the match the contract. If they chose not to, they will receive a 6th round draft pick as compensation.  On 29 April 2018, Nuñez-Roches officially re-signed with the Chiefs after no other teams made an offer. He was released by the Chiefs on 8 May 2018.

Indianapolis Colts
On 11 May 2018, Nuñez-Roches was claimed off waivers by the Indianapolis Colts. He was waived on 1 September 2018.

Tampa Bay Buccaneers

On 2 October 2018, Nuñez-Roches was signed by the Tampa Bay Buccaneers. He appeared in only three games for the remainder of the 2018 season.

On 15 March 2019, Nuñez-Roches was re-signed by the Buccaneers. He played in all 16 games but was used as a rotational player defensively for the 2019 season.

On 20 March 2020, Nuñez-Roches was re-signed by the Buccaneers. He finished the 2020 season with 20 tackles in 16 games, of which he started 11. The Buccaneers finished with an 11–5 record for a wild card spot and eventually won Super Bowl LV by a score of 31–9 over the Kansas City Chiefs.

On 20 March 2021, Nuñez-Roches was re-signed by the Buccaneers. In the 2021 season, he appeared in 16 games and started one. He had 17 total tackles and one forced fumble. In the 2022 season, he appeared in all 17 games, of which he started ten. He finished with two sacks and 33 total tackles.

New York Giants
On 17 March 2023, Nuñez-Roches signed a three-year, $12 million contract with the New York Giants.

NFL career statistics

Personal life
Born in Dangriga, Belize, Nuñez-Roches is fluent in both English and Garifuna.

References

External links

 Tampa Bay Buccaneers bio
 Southern Miss Golden Eagles bio

1993 births
Living people
People from Dangriga
Belizean emigrants to the United States
Belizean players of American football
Garifuna people
American football defensive tackles
American football defensive ends
Southern Miss Golden Eagles football players
Kansas City Chiefs players
Indianapolis Colts players
Tampa Bay Buccaneers players
New York Giants players